Kang Sung-hoon is a Korean name consisting of the family name Kang and the given name Sung-hoon, and may also refer to:

 Kang Sung-hoon (singer) (born 1980), South Korean singer
 Kang Sung-hoon (golfer) (born 1987), South Korean golfer